Gostuiyeh (also Romanized as Gostū’īyeh; also known as Gashtū’īyeh) is a village in Pariz Rural District, Pariz District, Sirjan County, Kerman Province, Iran. At the 2006 census, its population was 643, in 158 families.

References 

Populated places in Sirjan County